Anneslea is a genus of flowering plants belonging to the family Pentaphylacaceae.

Its native range is Nepal to Taiwan and Sumatra.

Species:

Anneslea donnaiensis 
Anneslea fragrans 
Anneslea paradoxa 
Anneslea steenisii

References

Pentaphylacaceae
Ericales genera